Nerbonne is a surname. Notable people with the surname include:

John Nerbonne (born 1951), American computational linguist
Laurence Nerbonne (born 1985), Canadian singer